Jake Ilardi (born March 11, 1997) is an American skateboarder.

Ilardi qualified to compete in the 2020 Tokyo Olympics as part of the first-ever U.S. Olympic skateboarding team.

Career highlights

References 

1997 births
Living people
American skateboarders
Olympic skateboarders of the United States
Skateboarders at the 2020 Summer Olympics